Javed Iqbal Tarkai is a Pakistani politician from Swabi who served as a member of the Khyber Pakhtunkhwa Assembly from 2008 to 2013.

References

Year of birth missing (living people)
Living people
Khyber Pakhtunkhwa MPAs 2008–2013
People from Swabi District